Bull Swamp Creek is a stream that flows from a small pond in Gaston, in Lexington County, South Carolina, United States to the North Fork Edisto River in North in Orangeburg County.

External links

References

Rivers of Lexington County, South Carolina
Rivers of Orangeburg County, South Carolina
Rivers of South Carolina